The 2011–12 season was Crystal Palace's seventh consecutive season in the Championship. The previous campaign had seen club legend Dougie Freedman take over as a novice manager and lead the Eagles to safety and another season in the English second tier.

Statistics

Player statistics
Last updated on 28 April 2012.

|-
|colspan="14"|Players who have featured for Crystal Palace in this season before returning to their parent club:

|}

Goalscorers

Club

Management

League table

Matches

Results round by round

Preseason

Football League Championship

August

September

October

November

December

January

February

March

April

Football League Cup

FA Cup

End-of-season awards

References

Notes

External links
 Crystal Palace F.C. official website
 Crystal Palace F.C. on Soccerbase 

2010-11
Crystal Palace
Crystal Palace F.C. season
Crystal Palace F.C. season